Mack Cummings (born March 3, 1959) is a former professional American football wide receiver in the National Football League. He would play with the New York Giants in 1987.

External links
Pro-Football reference

1959 births
Living people
Players of American football from Gainesville, Florida
East Tennessee State Buccaneers football players
New York Giants players